Lesbian, gay, bisexual, and transgender (LGBT) persons in  Saint Kitts and Nevis face legal challenges not experienced by non-LGBT residents. The penal code does not address discrimination or harassment on the account of sexual orientation or gender identity, nor does the law recognize same sex unions in any form, whether it be marriage or partnerships. Households headed by same-sex couples are also not eligible for any of the same rights given to opposite-sex married couples.

Legality of same-sex sexual activity 

Following a ruling of the Eastern Caribbean Supreme Court on 29 August 2022, consensual same-sex intercourse between adult males, in private, is no longer illegal in Saint Kitts and Nevis. 

Previously, Sections 56 and 57 of the "Offences Against the Person Act" criminalized same-sex sexual activity. The Court ruled that the sections violated the Saint Kitts and Nevis constitutional provisions guaranteeing a right to privacy and freedom of expression. The ruling had immediate effect. 

In 2011, the Government of St. Kitts and Nevis said it had “no mandate from the people” to abolish the criminalisation of homosexuality among consenting adults. However, despite the existence of the law on the books, there had been no known prosecution of same-sex sexual activity, according to the government.

Social conditions 
On 23 March 2005, the island of Nevis—part of the nation of Saint Kitts and Nevis—barred a cruise ship carrying 110 American passengers, mostly LGBT, from docking. A police boat halted the Source Events/Windjammer Barefoot Cruises ship and took the captain to shore for a meeting with port, police, customs and immigration officials, after which the ship was ordered to sail on. Port authority Acting General Manager Oral Brandy told reporters that Nevis does not want homosexuality "to be a part of our culture".

Summary table

See also 

Politics of Saint Kitts and Nevis
LGBT rights in the Commonwealth of Nations
LGBT rights in the Americas
LGBT rights by country or territory

References

Saint Kitts and Nevis
Law of Saint Kitts and Nevis
Society of Saint Kitts and Nevis
Saint Kitts and Nevis